The Nokia C series is a series of entry-level Android-powered Nokia-branded smartphones initially sold exclusively by Cricket Wireless. As of June 2020, the series consists only of the Nokia C5 Endi, which is a midrange smartphone, and the Nokia C2 Tava and Nokia C2 Tennen, which are entry-level smartphones.

Nokia C2 Tava / Tennen 

The Nokia C2 Tava and Nokia C2 Tennen are two Android-powered Nokia-branded smartphones marketed by HMD Global. They were announced on May 29, 2020, alongside the Nokia C5 Endi. The devices were made exclusively for sale under agreement with Cricket Wireless .

Specifications

Software 
The Nokia C2 Tava and Tennen were originally released with Android 10.

Hardware 
The Nokia C2 Tava and Tennen both run on the MediaTek Helio A22 system-on-chip paired with 2 GB of RAM. It is 9.1 mm thick. The device has a 5.45 inch IPS display. It has thick bezels and a chin at the bottom with the Nokia logo.

The Nokia C2 Tava and the Nokia C2 Tennen differ only in the colour of the devices; the Tava is sold exclusively in Tempered Blue, while the Tennen is sold in Steel colour.

Nokia C5 Endi 

The Nokia C5 Endi is an Android-powered Nokia-branded smartphone marketed by HMD Global. It was announced on May 29, 2020, alongside the Nokia C2 Tava and Nokia C2 Tennen, and launched on June 5, 2020. The device was made exclusively for sale under agreement with Cricket Wireless .

Specifications

Software 
The Nokia C5 Endi was originally released with Android 10.

Hardware 
The Nokia C5 Endi runs on a MediaTek Helio P22 system-on-chip paired with 3 GB of RAM. It is 8.9 mm thick. The device has a 6.517 inch IPS display. It has a "waterdrop notch" and a chin at the bottom with the Nokia logo.

References

External links
 Official Nokia C5 Endi website
 Official Nokia C2 Tava website
 Official Nokia C2 Tennen website

C series
Nokia phones by series
Mobile phones with multiple rear cameras